Sam's Throne is a hard sandstone rock climbing area in the Boston Mountains of north central Arkansas, in the Ozark - St. Francis National Forest. Among its attractions for serious rock climbers is the Chickenhead Wall formation. 

The area is extensively described in the guide "Arkansas Rock" Volume 1 by Clay Frisbie (Boston Mountain Press).

The surrounding area contains over 100 named climbing routes of various difficulty, and is serviced by a paved Forest Service Road from the town of Mount Judea.

References

Protected areas of Newton County, Arkansas
Climbing areas of the United States
Ozark–St. Francis National Forest